Toskić is a South-Slavic surname. It may be a matronymic derived from Toska, a diminutive of Teodosija and Teodora. According to Halil Bicaj, this surname is derived from Albanian ethnic subgroup of Tosks.

Notable people 
Alem Toskić (born 1982), Serbian handballer
Cecilija Toskić (born 1960), Bosnian short-story writer
Goran Toskić (born 1966), Croat, Bosnia and Herzegovina born entrepreneur
Idriz Toskić (born 1995), Montenegrin footballer
Vukašin Toskić, Serbian viticulture writer

Families
Families with the surname live in Serbia:
Aleksandrovac, Orthodox. The Toskić family in Tuleš, Aleksandrovac, were originally named Todorović, and their slava is that of St. George (Đurđevdan).
Kruševac, Orthodox.
Priboj, Muslim

and Montenegro: 
Kolašin
Bar
Gusinje 

Bosnia and Herzegovina
Vitina, Ljubuški

they emigrated from 1893 to 1934 from the town of Bar in Montenegro

See also
Toskići, settlement in Serbia
Tosković, surname

References

Serbian surnames
Bosnian surnames
Matronymic surnames